Flacăra (Romanian for "The Flame") may refer to:
Flacăra, a Romanian weekly magazine
Flacăra Iaşului, a Romanian regional newspaper
Flacăra lui Adrian Păunescu, a Romanian weekly magazine edited by Adrian Păunescu
Flacăra Moreni, a Romanian sports club from Moreni
Flacăra Ploieşti, a Romanian football club from Ploieşti
Flacăra București, a Romanian football club from Bucharest
Flacăra Petroşani, a Romanian football club from Petroşani
Flacăra Mediaş, a Romanian professional football club from Mediaş
Flacăra Stadium, a multi-use stadium in Moreni, Romania
Flacăra pe Comori, also known as Flames on the Treasures, a 1988 Romanian film